"A Song for You" is a song written and originally recorded by rock singer and pianist Leon Russell for his first solo album Leon Russell, which was released in 1970 on Shelter Records. A slow, pained plea for forgiveness and understanding from an estranged lover, the tune is one of Russell's best-known compositions. Russell not only sings and plays piano on the recording, but also plays the tenor horn that is accompanying. It has been performed and recorded by over 200 artists, spanning many musical genres. Elton John has called the song an American classic.

One of the first versions of the song that brought it broader attention was by Andy Williams, whose single peaked at number 29 on the adult contemporary chart and number 82 on the Billboard Hot 100 in 1971. Ray Charles recorded a version that earned him the 1994 Grammy Award for Best Male R&B Vocal Performance. Other notable versions were recorded by the Carpenters in 1972 and Herbie Hancock in 2005.

On January 17, 2018, "A Song for You" was added to Grammy Hall of Fame.

Notable cover versions
"A Song for You" has been covered many times since its release. The most notable versions include the following:
1971 – Andy Williams recorded the song for his covers album, You've Got a Friend. His version rose to number 29 on the Easy Listening chart (today's Adult Contemporary) in September 1971. At the same time it hit number 82 on the main pop singles chart.
1971 – Donny Hathaway recorded the song for his second album Donny Hathaway, featuring orchestral string and woodwind parts arranged by Arif Mardin. Hathaway's producer Jerry Wexler wrote that this version revealed why Mardin was known for the "fastest growing reputation among the new breed of arrangers..." Hathaway's gospel-inflected interpretation has been praised as redefining the song as his own. His live performances were electrifying, evoking a near-religious experience for the audience.
1972 – The Carpenters used the song for the name of their hit album A Song for You, and included it as the first track and the last track (in the form of a reprise). The Carpenters took Leon Russell's lyrical idea and expanded it to frame their whole album as a concept album. Though the song itself was not released as a single by the Carpenters, they performed it on a Bob Hope television special that aired on October 5, 1972. Their version is considered a standard of adult contemporary music.
1972 – Peggy Lee recorded the song on her 1972 album Norma Deloris Egstrom from Jamestown, North Dakota.
1973 – Willie Nelson sang a solo acoustic guitar version for his album Shotgun Willie, using his famous guitar Trigger. With this stripped-down arrangement, Nelson brings the greatest degree of intimacy to the song. Nelson also performed the song in the 1980 movie Honeysuckle Rose, and it appears on the movie's soundtrack. 
1974 – Aretha Franklin recorded a version of the song. 
1975 – The Temptations did a cover on the Album Titled Song for You is an album by The Temptations
1993 – Ray Charles recorded a version of the song on his 1993 album My World. Released as a single, it reached number 104 on the Bubbling Under Hot 100 Singles, and won him a Grammy Award for Best Male R&B Vocal Performance. Charles also performed the song at New York's Beacon Theatre on April 9, 2003, as part of Willie Nelson's 70th birthday tribute (released on DVD as Willie Nelson and Friends: Live & Kickin). Leon Russell sang the first verse, Willie Nelson sang the second verse, and Charles sang the remainder of the song in this unforgettable performance. Nelson, who stood nearby during Charles' performance, was visibly moved.
2005 – Herbie Hancock featuring Christina Aguilera. This version charted at number 11 on Billboard Smooth Jazz Airplay chart in May 2006. It was also nominated for Best Pop Collaboration with Vocals at the 2006 Grammy Awards. Hancock and Aguilera performed a live rendition at the ceremony.
2008 – Bizzy Bone featuring DMX & Chris Notez, rose to number 61 on the US Billboard Hot R&B/Hip-Hop Songs chart.
2009 – Whitney Houston recorded an uptempo version of the song for her final studio album I Look To You. Houston also performed a slowed down version of the song in 1991 at her Welcome Home Heroes with Whitney Houston concert. It was reported that Russell was so moved by the performance that he personally wrote her a letter expressing his admiration of her rendition of his song.
2011 – Amy Winehouse recorded a soulful version from her home that was included on the posthumous Lioness: Hidden Treasures compilation album. She was specifically covering the Donny Hathaway version and references him at the end of the recording.

References

1970s ballads
Pop ballads
Columbia Records singles
Virgin Records singles
1970 singles
1971 singles
1972 singles
2005 singles
2006 singles
2008 singles
Songs written by Leon Russell
Leon Russell songs
Andy Williams songs
Herbie Hancock songs
Christina Aguilera songs
The Carpenters songs
1970 songs
Ray Charles songs
Song recordings produced by Dick Glasser